George Fleury (1740-1825) was an Irish Anglican priest in the last decades of the 18th century and the first three of the 19th.

Fleury was  educated  at Trinity College, Dublin.  A prebendary of Lismore, he was Archdeacon of Waterford from 1773 until his death.  He was also Treasurer of Lismore from 1804.

His grandson Francis Leopold McClintock was a noted Arctic explorer.

References

19th-century Irish Anglican priests
Archdeacons of Waterford
Christian clergy from Dublin (city)
1740 births
1825 deaths
18th-century Irish Anglican priests
Alumni of Trinity College Dublin